Soraya Jiménez Mendivil (a twin sister born 5 August 1977 – 28 March 2013) was a Mexican weightlifter and Olympic champion. She participated at the 2000 Summer Olympics in Sydney where she won a gold medal. Jiménez became the first ever female athlete from Mexico to win an Olympic gold medal.

She died at age 35 on 28 March 2013 at her home in Mexico City after suffering a heart attack.

Major results
She competed at world championships, most recently at the 2003 World Weightlifting Championships.

References

1977 births
2013 deaths
Olympic medalists in weightlifting
Olympic weightlifters of Mexico
Olympic gold medalists for Mexico
People from Naucalpan
Sportspeople from the State of Mexico
Weightlifters at the 1999 Pan American Games
Weightlifters at the 2003 Pan American Games
Weightlifters at the 2000 Summer Olympics
Mexican female weightlifters
Medalists at the 2000 Summer Olympics
Pan American Games silver medalists for Mexico
Pan American Games medalists in weightlifting
Medalists at the 2003 Pan American Games
20th-century Mexican women
21st-century Mexican women